Akkula, alternate names being Ak-Kul' and Ak-Kulya, is a locality in Nurata District, Navoiy Region of Uzbekistan. The settlement in within the relative vicinity of Aydar Lake.

References

Populated places in Navoiy Region